Rui Santos (born 3 February 1967) is a Portuguese archer. He competed at the 1984 Summer Olympics and the 1988 Summer Olympics.

References

1967 births
Living people
Portuguese male archers
Olympic archers of Portugal
Archers at the 1984 Summer Olympics
Archers at the 1988 Summer Olympics
Place of birth missing (living people)